Julian Leist (born 11 March 1988) is a German football coach and a former player. He is an assistant coach with Stuttgarter Kickers.

Career

Leist, a defender, joined Bayern Munich II in 2010, having previously played for the reserve teams of TSV 1860 München and Stuttgarter Kickers. He made his debut in the opening match of the 2010–11 season, a 1–0 defeat against SV Babelsberg. He was released by Bayern in June 2011 after the reserve team were relegated from the 3. Liga and returned to Stuttgarter Kickers to play for the first team. In his first after returning to Kickers, he helped the club win the Regionalliga Süd and return to the 3. Liga. In July 2014, he left the club for a second time, joining newly promoted 3. Liga side SG Sonnenhof Großaspach.

References

External links
 

1988 births
Living people
Stuttgarter Kickers II players
Stuttgarter Kickers players
TSV 1860 Munich II players
FC Bayern Munich II players
SG Sonnenhof Großaspach players
German footballers
3. Liga players
Association football defenders
Footballers from Stuttgart